Sweet and Sentimental is a studio album by American country artist, Jan Howard. It was released in August 1962 via Capitol Records and contained 12 tracks. The disc was a collection of country and pop covers and was her only album for the Capitol label.

Background and recording
Jan Howard had recently risen to country music commercial success after having a top 20 Billboard single with "The One You Slip Around With". In 1962, her recording contract with the smaller Challenge label was bought by the larger Capitol Records company. Initially, Howard recorded several sides with an unnamed producer. However, she later reported in her autobiography that the original sessions were "a disaster". Upset with the sessions, Howard contacted Capitol producer, Ken Nelson. He agreed to produce her next sessions. The recording sessions for the album were held between February and May 1962. The sessions took place at the Columbia Studio, located in Nashville, Tennessee and were produced by Nelson.

Content
Sweet and Sentimental consisted of 12 tracks. Nelson attempted to market Howard's music towards a pop and Nashville Sound direction. This resulted in several pop cover recordings to appear on the album. Pop covers included Nat King Cole's number five Billboard pop single, "Looking Back", and Toni Arden's number 13 Billboard pop song, "Padre". Howard also covered Doris Day's top ten pop single, "Everybody Loves a Lover". Several covers of popular country songs were also featured on the project. Among them was Marty Robbins's "Don't Worry", Ray Price's "Heartaches by the Number", Billy Walker's "Funny How Time Slips Away" and Harlan Howard's "He Called Me Baby".

Several new selections were also part of the album. Many of these recordings were penned by Jan's husband, Harlan Howard, such as "Belle of the Ball", "They Listened While You Said Goodbye" and "This Sad Old House". The latter recording was co-written by Carlos Minor and was his first composition to be recorded by another artist. "This is my first song on a major record label, and I am happy and proud to say that it was two fine people in country music who helped me to the break," Minor told Billboard magazine.

Release and singles
Sweet and Sentimental was released in August 1962 on Capitol Records. It was Howard's debut studio album in her recording career and her only album on the Capitol label. It was originally issued as a vinyl LP, consisting of six songs on either side of the record. On the album's original release, background singing group, The Jordanaires, were given dual credit. On the disc it was labeled as "Jan Howard with The Jordanaires". In 2013, it was re-released digitally for music download and streaming purposes. It was distributed through the label, Marmot Music. One single was later spawned from the album. Howard's version of "Looking Back" was issued by Capitol Records in November 1962.

Track listing

Technical personnel
All credits are adapted from the liner notes of Sweet and Sentimental.

 Jan Howard – Lead vocals
 The Jordanaires – Background vocals
 Ken Nelson – Producer
 Ken Weedler – Cover photo

Release history

References 

1962 debut albums
Albums produced by Ken Nelson (United States record producer)
Capitol Records albums
Jan Howard albums